The WEW (World Entertainment Wrestling) Heavyweight Championship was a professional wrestling championship, most recently contested in Apache Army. It was originally created for Frontier Martial-Arts Wrestling as the WEW Single Championship. The title was revived in Pro Wrestling A-Team in 2018 as the WEW Openweight Championship.

Tournaments

Takeover the Independent Tournament
The "Takeover the Independent Tournament" was a sixteen-man single-elimination tournament held by Apache Army between July 25, 2012 and September 21, 2012.

HIROKI's Independent World Junior Heavyweight Championship was on the line in the match.

Title history

Combined reigns

See also
FMW Brass Knuckles Heavyweight Championship
NWA United National Heavyweight Championship
World Heavyweight Championship (Zero1)
Wrestle-1 Championship
KO-D Openweight Championship
BJW Deathmatch Heavyweight Championship
BJW World Strong Heavyweight Championship
Legend Championship

References

External links
 WEW World Heavyweight Championship

Frontier Martial-Arts Wrestling championships
Heavyweight wrestling championships
1999 establishments in Japan